Gavin Hunter Reid OBE (born 24 May 1934) was the Bishop of Maidstone from 1992 until 2001.
Primary school : part educated at Blackheath and Kidbrooke C of E school.

Reid was educated at The John Roan School in Greenwich and King's College London. Ordained deacon in 1960 and priest in 1961, after a curacy at St Paul's East Ham he served in a succession of administrative posts for the Church Pastoral Aid Society before his ordination to the episcopate. He is a prolific author and his works include The Gagging of God (1969), A New Happiness (1974), To Reach a Nation (1987), Our Place in his Story (1994) and To Canterbury with Love. He was awarded the OBE in 1999 for his contribution to the Millennium celebrations. He retired to Beccles in 2001 and is an assistant bishop in the Diocese of St Edmundsbury and Ipswich.

References

1934 births
People educated at the John Roan School
Alumni of King's College London
Living people
Bishops of Maidstone
20th-century Church of England bishops
21st-century Church of England bishops
Officers of the Order of the British Empire